Hispo georgius is a species of jumping spider (family Salticidae). It is found in Madagascar and Central, East and Southern Africa.

References

Salticidae
Spiders of Africa
Spiders described in 1892